Căinarii Vechi is a commune in Soroca District, Moldova. It is composed of two villages, Căinarii Vechi and Floriceni.

References

Communes of Soroca District